Mototada (written: 元忠 or 基忠) is a masculine Japanese given name. Notable people with the name include:

, Japanese kugyō
, Japanese samurai

Japanese masculine given names